William Blumberg and Max Schnur were the defending champions but chose to defend their title with different partners. Blumberg partnered Jackson Withrow but lost in the first round to Anirudh Chandrasekar and Vijay Sundar Prashanth. Schnur partnered Treat Huey but lost in the first round to Julian Cash and Henry Patten.

Cash and Patten won the title after defeating Alex Lawson and Artem Sitak 6–2, 6–4 in the final.

Seeds

Draw

References

External links
 Main draw

Charlottesville Men's Pro Challenger - Doubles
2022 Doubles